George Miller (March 16, 1799 – October 27, 1883) was an American lawyer, politician, and judge from New York.

Life 
Miller was born on March 16, 1799, in Miller Place, New York, the son of Timothy Miller and Mehetabel Brown.

Miller attended the Clinton Academy in East Hampton. He initially studied law under Selah B. Strong, later with Caleb S. Woodhull of New York City. In 1825, he moved to Riverhead and opened a law office there. He later took James H. Tuthill as a law partner. He and a few associates purchased an entire township of valuable timberland in Maine, which turned out to involve defective titles and led to a number of suits. He was also involved in a long contest with New York City Griswold merchants over the ownership of some lots in the Brooklyn Atlantic Dock.

In 1840, Miller was appointed Surrogate of Suffolk County. He was a supporter of the Maine law. In 1853, he was elected to the New York State Assembly as a Whig, representing the Suffolk County 1st District. He served in the Assembly in 1854, introducing a bill that would incorporate the Riverhead Canal and Mill Company. In 1857, he was appointed County Judge and Surrogate following the resignation of Abraham T. Rose. He lost the election for the position later that year to J. Lawrence Smith. He became district attorney of Suffolk County in 1858, and in the election that he ran as a Republican and won.

Miller supported and helped establish the Congregational Church in Riverhead. In around 1836, he married Eliza Leonard of Massachusetts, who worked as a teacher in Riverhead Academy for many years.

Miller died on October 27, 1883, twenty days after his wife. He was buried in Riverhead Cemetery.

References

External links 

 The Political Graveyard
 George Miller at Find a Grave

1799 births
1883 deaths
Politicians from Suffolk County, New York
Suffolk County district attorneys
People from Miller Place, New York
People from Riverhead (town), New York
19th-century American lawyers
New York (state) state court judges
19th-century American judges
County judges in the United States
New York (state) Whigs
Members of the New York State Assembly
New York (state) Republicans
American Congregationalists
Burials in New York (state)